Edwin Fisher Gilbert (June 22, 1929 – November 7, 2020) was an American competition swimmer who represented the United States at the 1948 Summer Olympics in London.  He competed for the gold medal-winning U.S. team in the qualifying heats of the men's 4×200-meter freestyle relay.  Gilbert did not receive a medal under the Olympic swimming rules in effect in 1948; only relay swimmers who competed in the event final were medal-eligible.

See also
 List of University of Texas at Austin alumni

References

1929 births
2020 deaths
American male freestyle swimmers
Olympic swimmers of the United States
Sportspeople from Beaumont, Texas
Swimmers at the 1948 Summer Olympics
Texas Longhorns men's swimmers
Swimmers from Texas
20th-century American people
21st-century American people